Otávio Augusto de Azevedo Sousa (born January 30, 1945) is a Brazilian actor.

Selected filmography
 Selva de Pedra (1986, TV Series)
 Tieta (1989, TV Series)
 Vamp (1991, TV Series)
 The Interview (1995)
 A Próxima Vítima (1995, TV Series) - Ulisses Carvalho
 Central Station (1998)
 A Padroeira (2001)
 Esperança (2002, TV Series)
 O Príncipe (2002)
 Kubanacan (2003)
 Cabocla (2004)
 Cobras & Lagartos (2006)
 Paraíso Tropical (2007)
 Duas Caras (2007)
 Araguaia (2010, TV Series)
 Avenida Brasil (2012, TV Series)
 Alto Astral (2014) 
 A Lei do Amor (2016)

References

External links

1945 births
Living people
Brazilian male television actors
Brazilian male telenovela actors
Brazilian male film actors
People from São Manuel